Annie is the diminutive of feminine given names such as Anna, Ann, Anne, Annette, Anita, Andrea, Angela, Anastasia and other variations. It may refer to:

People
Annie Lowrie Alexander (1864–1929), American physician and educator, first licensed female physician in the southern United States
Annie Montague Alexander (1867–1950), American philanthropist and paleontological collector
Annie Armstrong (1850–1938), American lay Southern Baptist denominational leader
Annie Maria Barnes (1857–?), American journalist, editor, author 
Annie Wall Barnett (1859–1942), American writer, litterateur, poet
Annie Skau Berntsen (1911–1992, also known as Sister Annie), Norwegian missionary in China and Hong Kong
Annie Besant (1847–1933), British socialist, theosophist, women's rights activist, writer and orator
Annie Borckink (born 1951), Dutch speed skater
Annie Babbitt Bulyea (1863–1934), Canadian temperance leader
Annie Cannon (1863–1941), American astronomer
Annie Carvosso (1861–1932), British-born Australian activist and social reformer
Annie Chapman (c. 1841–1888), born Eliza Ann Smith, a victim of Jack the Ripper
Annie Clark (actress) (born 1992), Canadian actress
Annie Clark (born 1982), American multi-instrumentalist, singer and songwriter known as St. Vincent
Annie W. Clark (1843–1907), American social reformer
Annie McCarer Darlington (1836–1907), American poet
Annie Le Porte Diggs (1853–1916), Canadian writer, advocate 	
Annie Dillard (born 1945), American author, best known for her narrative prose in both fiction and non-fiction
Annie Dookhan (born 1977), former crime lab chemist who admitted to falsifying evidence affecting up to 34,000 cases
Annie Duke (born 1965), American poker player
Annie Easley (1933–2011), African-American computer scientist, mathematician and rocket scientist
Annie Ee Yu Lian (1988–2015), Singaporean abuse and murder victim
Annie Ernaux (born 1940), French writer
Anne Fraïsse (born 1959), French latinist, academic, and university president
Annie Somers Gilchrist (1841–1912), American writer
Annie Girardot (1931–2011), French actress
Annie Ryder Gracey (1836–1908), American writer, missionary 
Annie Haslam (born 1944), UK progressive rock musician and painter
Annie Hawks (1836–1918), American poet, gospel hymnist 
Annie Taylor Hyde (1849–1909), American Mormon leader and Utah pioneer
Annie Laurie Wilson James (1862–?), American journalist 
Annie Kanahele (1896/97–1989), educator and Hawaiiana expert 
Annie May Hurd Karrer (1893–1984), US plant physiologist
Annie Chambers Ketchum (1824–1904), American educator, lecturer, writer
Annie LeBlanc (born 2004), American actress, singer, and Youtuber
Annie Leibovitz (born 1949), American portrait photographer
Annie Lennox (born 1954), Scottish singer, vocalist of Eurythmics
Annie Leonard (born 1964), American critic of excessive consumerism
Annie Londonderry (1870–1947), Latvian-born American immigrant, first woman to bicycle around the world
Annie Lööf (born 1983), Swedish politician and lawyer
Annie Mac (born 1978), Irish DJ and presenter
Annie Malone (1877–1957), African-American businesswoman, inventor and philanthropist
Annie Virginia McCracken (1686–?), American author
Annie Millwood (died 1888), postulated, but not definitely known to be Jack the Ripper's first victim
Annie Russell Maunder (1868–1947), Northern Irish astronomer and mathematician
Annie Mumolo (born 1973), American actress
Annie Murphy (born 1986), Canadian actress
Annie Murray (1906–1996), Scottish nurse
Annie Murray (writer), English writer
Annie Feray Mutrie (1826–1893), British painter
Annie Nightingale (born 1940), British radio broadcaster
Annie Oakley (1860–1926), American sharpshooter
Annie Palmen (1926–2000), Dutch singer
Annie Parisse (born 1975), American actress
Annie Pearson, Viscountess Cowdray (1860–1931), English suffragist and philanthropist
Annie Fitzgerald Stephens (1844–1934), American landowner
Annie Stevens Perkins (1868–?), American writer
Annie Potts (born 1952), American actress
Annie Proulx (born 1935), American novelist, short story writer and journalist
Annie Qu, Chinese statistician
Annie M.G. Schmidt (1911–1995), Dutch writer
Annie St-Pierre, Canadian film director and producer
Annie or Anne Sullivan (1866–1936), American teacher, best known as the instructor and lifelong companion of Helen Keller
Annie Swynnerton (1844–1933), English painter
Annie Edson Taylor (1838–1921), American schoolteacher, first person to survive going over Niagara Falls in a barrel
Annie Royle Taylor (1855–1922), British evangelist to China and Tibetan explorer
Annie Thompson (1845–1913), wife of John Thompson, fourth prime minister of Canada
Annie Rensselaer Tinker (1884–1924), volunteer nurse in WWI, suffragist, and philanthropist
Annie Caroline Pontifex Toorop (1891–1955), Dutch painter and lithographer
Annie Russell Wall (1859–1942), American author
Annie Walsh, American gangster also known as "Battle Annie"
Annie Wersching (1977–2023), American actress
Annie Williams (disambiguation)
Annie Williams (suffragette) (c. 1860–1943), British women's rights activist
Annie Leong Wai Mun (1971–2001), better known as Annie Leong, Singaporean murder victim.

Fictional characters
 The title character of the comic strip Little Orphan Annie, also in plays and movies
 Annie Brackett, in the movie Halloween (1978) by John Carpenter and in the remake Halloween (2007) by Rob Zombie
 Annie Edison, in the NBC sitcom Community, played by Alison Brie
 The titular character of the 1977 American romantic comedy film Annie Hall, played by Diane Keaton
 Annie January, a main character in The Boys
 Annie Landsberg, a main character in Maniac
 Annie Leonhardt, an antagonist of the manga and anime Attack on Titan
 Annie Preston, a character from the CBS sitcom The New Dick Van Dyke Show.
 Annie Sawyer, a protagonist of the British television series Being Human
 Annie Scrambler, a character from the TV series  The Electric Company 
 Annie Wainwright, in the BBC school drama Grange Hill
 Annie Wilkes, in the novel Misery by Stephen King and in the film Misery
 Annie, the protagonist of the American animated television series Little Einsteins
 Annie Onion, in the animated Christian direct-to-video series VeggieTales
 Annie and Clarabel, coaches in Thomas the Tank Engine & Friends
 Annie, in the Magic Tree House series of children's books
 Annie, a minor character in the horror film Friday the 13th (1980).
 Annie, the Dark Child, a playable champion in the multiplayer online battle arena video game League of Legends
 Annie, a shopkeeper from Splatoon
 Annie, the main character in Bridesmaids (2011 film)

See also
 Cougar Annie, pioneer on Vancouver Island, Canada, born Ada Annie Rae-Arthur (1888–1985)
 Annie (disambiguation)
 Anna (disambiguation)

Dutch feminine given names
English feminine given names
Scottish feminine given names
Welsh feminine given names
Lists of people by given name